The BMW M Coupé and BMW M Roadster are high performance models of the BMW Z3 and Z4 coupés/roadsters produced by BMW M. The first generation was based on the Z3 and was produced between 1998 and 2002. The second generation was based on the Z4 and was produced between 2006 and 2008.

All models were produced in the BMW Spartanburg plant in the United States. Some major components— such as the engine and transmission— were imported from Germany.

First generation (1997–2002)

Z3 M Roadster 

The M-Roadster E36/7 was introduced in 1997 as the high performance version of the BMW Z3. The most significant cosmetic difference between the M-Roadster, including the M-Coupe, is the substantially flared rear quarter-panels ("fender flares") and the correspondingly offset rear wheels. Additional external differences compared to the standard Z3 models included front and rear bumpers, gills, quad exhaust, trunk, and mirrors.

The standard Z3 models received a facelift in 1999. The appearance of the M was not changed

In the 6 years from 1997 to 2002, 15,322 M Roadsters were produced.

M Coupé 
The M Coupé E36/8, manufactured from 1998 until 2002, was developed under the leadership of engineer Burkhard Göschel with the intention of adding increased torsional and structural rigidity to the Z3 roadster's chassis. The development team had a hard time convincing the Board of Directors to approve the model for production, but it was eventually given the green light as long as it remained cost-effective to produce. To achieve this goal, majority of the body panels had to be shared with the M roadster, thus the doors and everything from the A-pillar forward are interchangeable between the coupé and roadster, as are most interior parts. The Z3 coupé, which combines the M coupe's body with the standard Z3 drivetrain, chassis. and cosmetics was approved for production at the same time.

Sales were slow as BMW provided almost zero marketing budget to prevent direct sales competition from the more profitable E46 M3. The S54 engine was detuned to 315hp despite a shorter better flowing exhaust and the car was denied the Getrag S6S-420G 6 speed transmission despite the chassis being built with the necessary mounting points. The differential gearing on the S54 M Coupes was increased from 3.23 to 3.15 to further handicap performance while the E46 M3 paired a 3.63 final drive to same powertrain.  Gearing on the ZF and Getrag boxes is the same for the 1st-5th gears, but the Getrag adds the .83 overdrive.  As a result of their relative rarity, M Coupes (especially S54 powered models) retain much of their value. The M Coupe powered by the S54 engine is one of the lowest production BMWs with only 1,112 built in total for all markets. It was given nicknames like "clown shoe" because of its distinctive styling.

Engines 
The M Coupe and M Roadster were initially powered by the engines from the E36 M3. This means that most countries initially used the 3.2 L version of the BMW S50 engine, while North American models initially used the less powerful BMW S52 engine.
A total of 2,999 cars were built with the S50 engine and 2,180 cars were built with the S52 engine.

Starting in February 2001, the engines were upgraded to the BMW S54 engine from the E46 M3. The difference in peak power and torque is due to the catalytic converters being located closer to the engine on the North American spec cars, which allows the catalysts to heat up faster and reduce cold start emissions. 678 M Coupes were made for the American market, with a total of 1,112 M Coupes built with the S54 engine worldwide.

Color Options 
The M Coupé had the following OEM color options: Alpine White III, Imola Red II, Dakar Yellow II, Evergreen, Laguna Seca Blue, Cosmos Black, Black Sapphire Metallic, Arctic Silver Metallic, Titanium Silver Metallic, Estoril Blue Metallic, Boston Green Metallic, Oxford Green II Metallic, Steel Grey Metallic, Phoenix Yellow Metallic.

Transmission 
The gearbox is a ZF Type C 5-speed manual. The final drive is either 3.23:1 (S52) or 3.15:1 (S50 and S54). A limited slip differential with a maximum locking of 25 percent is standard.

Chassis 
Like all Z3 models, the M Coupe and M Roadster's suspension is made up of MacPherson struts in the front and semi-trailing arms in the rear. Compared to the six-cylinder Z3 roadster, however, the M roadster included modifications such as wider front and rear tracks (by ), reduced ride height (by ), modified front suspension geometry, firmer springs and shocks, thicker anti-roll bars, stronger semi-trailing arms and a reinforced subframe.

When the M roadster switched to the S54 engine (2/01 production), the chassis was upgraded to the stiffer springs and shocks developed for the M Coupé.

Brakes 
In most countries, the front discs were a two-piece "floating rotor" design.

Unlike the US market where the two-piece floating rotor brakes were not available, the Canadian market cars were equipped with the floating discs.

Wheels and tyres 
Front tyres were 225/45ZR17 and rear tyres were 245/40ZR17. The wheel sizes were 7.5x17-inch at the front and 9x17-inch at the rear. Early M coupes (S50 and S52 engines) had a silverly chromeline finish, whereas the later models (S54 engine) had a darker two stage Chrome Shadow finish also used on the E46 M3.

Second generation (2006–2008)

Z4 M Coupé 
The coupé model was introduced to the public first in concept form at the 2005 Frankfurt Motor Show and then in production form at the 2006 Geneva International Motor Show with production starting shortly after.

The Z4 M Coupé has a fastback coupé design, resulting in a different body shape to its Z3 M Coupe predecessor.

The Z4 M Coupé set a laptime at the Nürburgring Nordschleife of 8 minutes and 15 seconds.

Z4 M Roadster 

The roadster model was launched in late 2006.

Unlike the Z3 M Roadster, the external dimensions of the Z4 M Roadster are the same as the standard Z4.

Engine 
The M Coupe and M Roadster are powered by the BMW S54 straight-six engine from the E46 M3. The engine has fly-by-wire throttle and double VANOS (variable valve timing). The engine has a redline of 8,000 rpm. Unlike the S54 engine from the E46 M3 and Z3 M Roadster and Coupes, where BMW used the same MSS54 DME, the Z4 M Coupe and Roadster engine is controlled by the MSS70 DME which makes popular ECU tuning options for S54 engines on the E46 M3 and Z3 M models obsolete on the Z4 M.

Drivetrain 
The engine was mated to a new 6-speed "Type H" ZF manual transmission since the M3's original 6-speed transmission did not fit the Z4's chassis.

The Z4 uses the same limited slip differential as the E46 M3.

Chassis 
The suspension system consisted of a strut design at the front and a multi-link design at the rear. The springs have higher spring rates and the dampers have a more aggressive setting as compared to the Z4 M roadster. The car achieved a lateral acceleration of 0.89g on the skid pad.

The Z4 M uses hydraulic power steering, unlike the electric power steering used by the rest of the Z4 range and has thick rimmed steering wheel. Other changes include a wider front track, revised front suspension and steering geometry.

Many components were shared with the E46 M3, including the rear subframe, front suspension control arms and the Continental ContiSport Contact tyres.

Brakes 
The braking system shares many parts in common with the E46 M3. The brake calipers are from the M3 Competition model and the brake discs (consisting of aluminum hubs, stainless steel pins, cross drilled iron floating rotors) are from the E46 M3 CSL.  Despite increases in rotor sizes, brake pads are the same part # for all E36 M3, E46 M3, and M Roadster models.

Production 
Production began on 4 April 2006 and ended in 2008 when the E85/E86 Z4 was replaced by the E89 Z4. A total of 4,275 M Coupes were produced, and 5,070 M Roadsters. This included 1,815 M Coupes for North America and 3,042 M Roadsters for North America.

Awards
Automobile Magazine "Design of the Year" 1999.
The M Coupe/M Roadster made Car and Driver magazine's "Ten Best" list for 1999.
European Car Magazine Grand Prix winner in 1999.
The Top Gear (TV Show) "Best Driver's Car of the Year" 2000.
The BMW M Coupe was chosen as one of "Hammond's Icons" by Top Gear in 2011.
Jalopnik's included the M Coupe in their "Best 10 Cars of the Decade" feature.
Top Gear (Magazine) featured the M Coupe as one of "the 149 Coolest Cars Ever" in a supplement included with the October 2015 issue (#274).
Autoblog included the M Coupe in their "Greatest BMWs of the last 100 years" feature.
The New York Daily News featured the M Coupe in their "Best Bimmers: our 10 favorite BMW models of the last 100 years" article.
Top Gear (Website) included the BMW M Coupe in their "Some of the Greatest BMWs ever built" article, showcasing 25 cars, in celebration of BMW's centenary.
The M Coupé appeared on the list of Autoevolution's "Ten of the Most Outstanding BMW M Cars of All Time".
 Mike Spinelli, founder of Jalopnik and host of AFTER/DRIVE, selected the BMW M Coupé on /Drive's "What's The Best BMW Of All Time?" feature.
 Road & Track included the M Coupé as 1 of just 13 BMWs in their "Best BMWs in History" feature for the company's 100 year anniversary.
 Maxim ranked the M Coupé in their feature of the "10 Most Killer Rides of the '90s".
 Donut Media featured the M Coupé as #11 in their "14 Best Cars BMW Ever Made" video.
 CarWOW's "Top 10 best BMW M cars. EVER!" placed the M Coupé at #6 on their list.

References

M Roadster
Cars introduced in 1998
Cars introduced in 2006
Roadsters
Rear-wheel-drive vehicles

zh:BMW M Roadster